Blind Justice (also known as Hold My Hand I'm Dying) is a 1988 drama film directed by Terence Ryan and starring Christopher Cazenove, Oliver Reed, Patrick Shai, and Edita Brychta. It was written by Mark Ezra. Based on the 1967 book Hold My Hand I'm Dying by John Gordon Davis, it was commercially released in Italy in October 1988.

Plot
When the British territory of Southern Rhodesia issues a unilateral declaration of independence (UDI) in 1965, it means freedom and hope for some; despair, fear, and death for others. The one thing certain is that nobody can escape the changes it will bring - least of all Joseph Mahoney, the last colonial commissioner in Kariba Gorge, who finds himself charged with a vast region thrown into turmoil as UDI becomes reality. With the assistance of Afrikaner naturalist Suzie de Villiers (whose abusive Calvinist Boer father does not want her around Joseph because Joseph is English) and his loyal Ndebele employee Sampson, Mahoney finds himself struggling to see justice administered to all despite unsympathetic colonists, tribal intrigues, and a mounting rural insurgency. Meanwhile, Sampson finds himself torn between his commitment to ZAPU nationalists and his friendship with Joseph. After Mahoney settles permanently in Rhodesia on Suzie's farm, ZIPRA orders Sampson to bomb the homestead; the latter is appalled, and only carries out his attack when his employers are away.

Captured by the Rhodesian Security Forces, Sampson now stands trial for attempted murder - while Joseph leads an increasingly desperate race against the clock to secure a pardon, win back an estranged Suzie, and try to stop his adopted homeland from being plunged into a fresh wave of bloodletting and vengeance.

Cast
 Christopher Cazenove as Joseph Mahoney
 Edita Brychta as Suzie de Villiers
 Oliver Reed as Ballinger
 Patrick Shai
 Henry Cele as Kamisu

Production
Blind Justice was filmed in the Mashonaland region of northeastern Zimbabwe and in the area around the Bumi Hills area near Lake Kariba where the story is set.

Music and soundtrack
The song "Paradise Road" that appears in the film was sung by Dobie Gray. The music for the film was by Julian Laxton, Fransua Roos, and Patric van Blerk.

See also

References

External links
 
 
 

1980s war drama films
Films set in 1958
Films set in 1965
Rhodesian Bush War films
Cold War films
British war drama films
Films set in Rhodesia
Films based on Zimbabwean novels
Films about racism
Films about race and ethnicity
1980s English-language films
Films directed by Terence Ryan
1980s British films